Grancy is a Lausanne Métro station on M2 line. It was opened on 27 October 2008 as part of the inaugural section of the line, from Croisettes to Ouchy–Olympique. The station is located between Lausanne-Gare and Délices.

In 1877, a funicular between Lausanne and Ouchy was opened. In 1898, Montriond station was added to it, and in 1959 the funicular was rebuilt as a rack railway. In 2003, the railway was demolished to give way for construction of M2 line. Montriond station was demolished as well and moved closer to Lausanne railway station; in 2008 it was reopened as Grancy.

References

Lausanne Metro stations
Railway stations in Switzerland opened in 2008